Moshe Michael "Mickey" Rosenthal (born 4 February 1955) is an Israeli investigative journalist and politician. He is a member of the Labor Party and was placed twelfth on the party's list for the 2013 Knesset elections. He served as a member of the Knesset for the Labor Party and the Zionist Union between February of 2013 and April of 2019.

Rosenthal together with Israeli director Ilan Abudi made the film The Shakshuka System about support for wealthy families, in particular the Ofer family, by the Israeli government.

Mickey Rosenthal studied general history and philosophy at Tel Aviv University but didn't graduate. He is married with three children and lives in Givatayim.

References

External links

1955 births
Living people
Israeli Jews
Israeli journalists
Israeli Labor Party politicians
Jewish Israeli politicians
Members of the 19th Knesset (2013–2015)
Members of the 20th Knesset (2015–2019)
People from Givatayim
People from Tel Aviv
Zionist Union politicians